Colegio Amerigo Vespucci is an Italian private school in Caracas, Venezuela.

Data

The college is named after Amerigo Vespucci, an Italian explorer, navigator and cartographer who first demonstrated that Brazil and the West Indies did not represent Asia's eastern outskirts as initially conjectured from Columbus' voyages, but instead constituted an entirely separate landmass hitherto unknown to Old Worlders: even because of this demonstration the name "America" of this landmass is derived from him.

The school is an italo-venezuelan Unidad educativa in the capital Caracas and has "kinder", "elementary" and "bachelor" (or high school) sections, where the Italian language lessons are mandatory. The Colegio Vespucci was home of the Italian Istituto tecnico per geometri "Luigi Einaudi", mainly during the 1970s and 1980s.

History

The Colegio Italo venezolano "Amerigo Vespucci" (called "Scuola Vespucci" by the Italians) was created on May 27, 1958 in the urbanization "La Carlota", Caracas, by famous professor Maria Cerolini with a group of thirty-five (35) Italian students, distributed between preschool and basic education from first through fourth grade (the courses were only in Italian language).

In 1962 it changed its headquarters to the urbanization "Los Chorros" of eastern Caracas in a bigger building. The students were now three hundred (300), divided between preschool, primary and middle school with classes in Italian and Spanish language.

By 1967 the third stage of Basic Education was created, and the First and Second year of "Diversificado" (Italian and Venezuelan high school) with the area of "Sciences". In the 1970s it was the second most important Italian school in Caracas (after the Colegio Agustin Codazzi), with the Istituto tecnico per geometri "Luigi Einaudi" di Caracas.

In the 1960s and 1970s it was one of the two main Italian schools of Caracas, with the Colegio Agustín Codazzi. In those decades the majority of students in the Italian community of Caracas attended mainly these two "scuole", with rivalry also in sport matches (like soccer).

The Directors of the Vespucci in 1981 created the University Institute of Technology "Amerigo Vespucci" (UITAV) and in 1988 from the UITAV there were graduates in "Senior Technical Business Administration of Business Administration and of Accounting & Finance" (in the next fourteen years the IUTAV did two additional courses: Computers and Advertising & Marketing).

Actually the Colegio Vespucci is a "Unidad Educativa" with more than 2000 students. In the Venezuelan "bachillerato" of the Colegio Vespucci the courses of Italian language are mandatory.

See also
 Colegio Agustín Codazzi
 Colegio De Marta
 Italo-Venezuelans
 Italian language in Venezuela

Notes

Italian international schools in South America
International schools in Venezuela